There are 30 public libraries in Delaware County, Pennsylvania.  The Delaware County Libraries is a federation of 26 library organizations, with 28 branches. The law library in the county courthouse is not a member of the county system, but its holdings are listed in the system catalog.  The Upper Chichester Library is located in the county but not part of the system.

The libraries in the county system are independent non-profit organizations which are funded by local municipalities, the Commonwealth of Pennsylvania through the county system, and from donations. A library card from any library in the system is valid at all other libraries in the system and at most libraries in the state.

The county system serves 550,000 residents with a collection of 1,400,000 volumes. 2,150,000 items circulate per year.

References

External links

Delaware County Libraries book search

County library systems in Pennsylvania
Delaware County, Pennsylvania